Parker Bridge is a truss bridge in the city of Parker, Pennsylvania in the United States.  The bridge, constructed in 1934, carries motor vehicles and pedestrians over the Allegheny River. The Parker Bridge is a variation of the Pratt truss bridge, a design invented by the late Charles H. Parker in the 20th century.

See also 
List of crossings of the Allegheny River

External links 
Webpage dedicated to the Parker Bridge and other historic bridges

Bridges over the Allegheny River
Truss bridges in the United States
Bridges completed in 1934
Bridges in Armstrong County, Pennsylvania
Road bridges in Pennsylvania
Steel bridges in the United States
1934 establishments in Pennsylvania